Lipoxygenase homology domains 1 is a protein in humans that is encoded by the LOXHD1 gene.

Function 

This gene encodes a highly conserved protein consisting entirely of PLAT (polycystin/lipoxygenase/alpha-toxin) domains, thought to be involved in targeting proteins to the plasma membrane. Studies in mice show that this gene is expressed in the mechanosensory hair cells in the inner ear, and mutations in this gene lead to auditory defects, indicating that this gene is essential for normal hair cell function. Screening of human families segregating deafness identified a mutation in this gene which causes DFNB77, a progressive form of autosomal-recessive nonsyndromic hearing loss (ARNSHL). Alternatively spliced transcript variants encoding different isoforms have been noted for this gene.

References

Further reading